Neil Amwin Treharne Adcock (8 March 1931 – 6 January 2013) was a South African international cricketer who played in 26 Test matches. A tall aggressive fast bowler, he could lift the ball sharply off a length. He was the first South African fast bowler to take 100 Test wickets.

Life
Adcock was born on 8 March 1931 in Sea Point, Cape Town. He made his Test debut in 1953 at home against New Zealand, after only nine first-class games. He finished the series with 24 wickets, including 8 for 87 in his second Test (total for both innings).

Adcock was one of the five Wisden Cricketers of the Year in 1961. The previous year in South Africa's tour of England he took 26 wickets in the Tests and 108 wickets in total at an average of 14. In doing so he became the only fast bowler to take more than 100 wickets in a tour of England. It was a controversial tour with his bowling partner Geoff Griffin being no-balled for throwing.

After retiring from cricket he became a radio commentator and worked in the travel industry. Neil Adcock was survived by his wife Maureen, his children from his first marriage to Diana (née Devine) Adcock, daughter Susan Dance, his son Alan and three grandchildren.

References

External links
 

1931 births
2013 deaths
Gauteng cricketers
KwaZulu-Natal cricketers
South Africa Test cricketers
South African cricketers
Wisden Cricketers of the Year
International Cavaliers cricketers
Deaths from cancer in South Africa
South African cricket commentators